CGCG may refer to:

 Catalogue of Galaxies and of Clusters of Galaxies
 Central giant-cell granuloma, a localised benign condition of the jaws